The environmental effects of shipping include air pollution, water pollution, acoustic, and oil pollution. Ships are responsible for more than 18 percent of some air pollutants.

As for greenhouse gas emissions, the International Maritime Organization (IMO) estimates that carbon dioxide emissions from shipping were equal to 2.89% of the global human-made emissions in 2018 and expects them to rise to 90-130% of 2008 emissions by 2050 if no action is taken.

Although in the movement of a given mass of cargo a given distance, ships are the most energy-efficient method, the sheer size of the maritime transport industry means that it has a significant effect on the environment. The annual increasing amount of shipping overwhelms gains in efficiency, such as from slow-steaming. The growth in tonne-kilometers of sea shipment has averaged 4 percent yearly since the 1990s, and it has grown by a factor of 5 since the 1970s. There are now over 100,000 transport ships at sea, of which about 6,000 are large container ships.

The fact that shipping enjoys substantial tax privileges has contributed to the growing emissions.

Ballast water

Ballast water discharges by ships can have a negative impact on the marine environment. Cruise ships, large tankers, and bulk cargo carriers use a huge amount of ballast water, which is often taken on in the coastal waters in one region after ships discharge wastewater or unload cargo, and discharged at the next port of call, wherever more cargo is loaded. Ballast water discharge typically contains a variety of biological materials, including plants, animals, viruses, and bacteria. These materials often include non-native, nuisance, invasive, exotic species that can cause extensive ecological and economic damage to aquatic ecosystems along with serious human health problems.

Sound pollution
Noise pollution caused by shipping and other human enterprises has increased in recent history. The noise produced by ships can travel long distances, and marine species who may rely on sound for their orientation, communication, and feeding, can be harmed by this sound pollution.

The Convention on the Conservation of Migratory Species has identified ocean noise as a potential threat to marine life. The disruption of whales' ability to communicate with one another is an extreme threat and is affecting their ability to survive. According to a Discovery Channel article on Sonic Sea Journeys Deep into the Ocean over the last century, extremely loud noise from commercial ships, oil and gas exploration, naval sonar exercises and other sources has transformed the ocean's delicate acoustic habitat, challenging the ability of whales and other marine life to prosper and ultimately to survive. Whales are starting to react to this in ways that are life-threatening. Kenneth C. Balcomb, a whale researcher and a former U.S Navy officer states that the day 15 March 2000, is the day of infamy. Although sonar helps to protect us, it is destroying marine life. According to IFAW Animal Rescue Program Director Katie Moore, "There's different ways that sounds can affect animals. There's that underlying ambient noise level that's rising, and rising, and rising that interferes with communication and their movement patterns. And then there's the more acute kind of traumatic impact of sound, that's causing physical damage or a really strong behavioral response. It's fight or flight".

Wildlife collisions

Marine mammals, such as whales and manatees, risk being struck by ships, causing injury and death. For example, a collision with a ship traveling at only 15 knots has a 79% chance of being lethal to a whale. Ship collisions may be one of the leading causes of population decline for whale sharks.

One notable example of the impact of ship collisions is the endangered North Atlantic right whale, of which 400 or fewer remain. The greatest danger to the North Atlantic right whale is injury sustained from ship strikes. Between 1970 and 1999, 35.5% of recorded deaths were attributed to collisions. From 1999 to 2003, incidents of mortality and serious injury attributed to ship strikes averaged one per year. From 2004 to 2006, that number increased to 2.6. Deaths from collisions has become an extinction threat. The United States' National Marine Fisheries Service (NMFS) and National Oceanic and Atmospheric Administration (NOAA) introduced vessel speed restrictions to reduce ship collisions with North Atlantic right whales in 2008, which expired in 2013. However, in 2017 an unprecedented mortality event occurred, resulting in the deaths of 17 North Atlantic right whales caused primarily from ship-strikes and entanglement in fishing gear.

Atmospheric pollution
Exhaust gases from ships are considered to be a significant source of air pollution, both for conventional pollutants and greenhouse gases.

Conventional pollutants

Air pollution from ships is generated by diesel engines that burn high sulfur content fuel oil, also known as bunker oil, producing sulfur dioxide, nitrogen oxide and particulate, in addition to carbon monoxide, carbon dioxide, and hydrocarbons which again leads to the formation of aerosols and secondary chemicals reactions including formations of HCHO, Ozone etc. in the atmosphere. Diesel exhaust has been classified by the U.S. Environmental Protection Agency (EPA) as a likely human carcinogen. The agency recognizes that these emissions from marine diesel engines contribute to ozone and carbon monoxide nonattainment (i.e., failure to meet air quality standards), as well as adverse health effects associated with ambient concentrations of particulate matter and visibility, haze, acid deposition, and eutrophication and nitrification of water. EPA estimates that large marine diesel engines accounted for about 1.6 percent of mobile source nitrogen oxide emissions and 2.8 percent of mobile source particulate emissions in the United States in 2000. Contributions of marine diesel engines can be higher on a port-specific basis. Ultra-low sulfur diesel (ULSD) is a standard for defining diesel fuel with substantially lowered sulfur contents.  As of 2006, almost all of the petroleum-based diesel fuel available in Europe and North America is of a ULSD type.  However, bunker oil is still available, and large marine engines are able to switch between the two types simply by opening and closing the respective valves from two different on-board fuel tanks.

In 2016, the IMO adopted new sulfur-emissions regulations for implementation by larger ships beginning in January 2020.

Of total global air emissions, marine shipping accounts for 18 to 30 percent of the nitrogen oxides and 9% of the sulfur oxides. Sulfur in the air creates acid rain which damages crops and buildings. When inhaled, sulfur is known to cause respiratory problems and even increases the risk of a heart attack. According to Irene Blooming, a spokeswoman for the European environmental coalition Seas at Risk, the fuel used in oil tankers and container ships is high in sulfur and cheaper to buy compared to the fuel used for domestic land use. "A ship lets out around 50 times more sulfur than a lorry per tonne of cargo carried." 
  
Cities in the United States like Long Beach, Los Angeles, Houston, Galveston, and Pittsburgh see some of the heaviest shipping traffic, which has left local officials desperately trying to clean up the air. Increasing trade between the United States and China is helping to increase the number of vessels navigating the Pacific and is exacerbating multiple environmental problems. To maintain the level of growth China is experiencing, large amounts of grain are being shipped to China. The numbers of shipments are expected to continue increasing.

In contrast to sulfur emissions (which depend on the fuel used), nitrous oxide emissions are primarily a function of combustion temperature. As air contains over 70% nitrogen by volume, some of it will react with oxygen during combustion. Given that those reactions are endothermic, a higher amount of nitrous oxides will be produced at higher combustion temperatures. However, other pollutants, particularly unburned or partially burnt hydrocarbons (also known as hyperfine particulates or soot), will be more common at lower combustion temperatures, so there is a trade-off between nitrogen oxides and soot. 
  
Other than replacing ambient air with pure oxygen or some other oxidizing agent, the only ways to significantly reduce the nitrogen oxide emissions are via passing flue gasses through a catalytic converter and/or diesel exhaust fluid treatment, whereby an aqueous solution of urea reacts with the nitrous oxides in the flue gas to produce nitrogen, carbon dioxide and water. However, both those options add cost and weight. Furthermore, the urea in diesel exhaust fluid is usually derived from fossil fuels, and therefore it is not carbon neutral.

A third option entails the use of wet scrubbers that essentially spray seawater through the exhaust column as it is pumped through a chamber.  Depending on the detailed engineering-design attributes of the wet scrubber, these devices can wash out the sulfur oxides, soot and nitrogen oxides from the engine exhaust, thus leaving a sludge that contains soot and various acidic compounds (or neutralized compounds, if alkaline substances are mixed in with the scrubbing liquid beforehand).  This material can then be either treated via an on-board device (closed-loop system), or it can simply be dumped overboard (open-loop system).  The discharged material can be harmful to marine life, especially in nearshore settings.

In a recent study, the future of ship emissions has been investigated and reported that the growth of carbon dioxide emissions do not change with most common alternatives such as Ultra-low sulfur diesel (ULSD) or liquified natural gas (LNG) as well as growing volume of methane emission due to methane slip through the LNG supply-chain. Methane is a much more powerful greenhouse gas than carbon dioxide per unit volume, and is only slowly broken down in the environment by various chemical, photochemical and biological processes.

In inland-waters-based applications where sulfur cannot (fully) be removed from the fuel before combustion (desulfurization), flue gas scrubbing is commonly employed. However, this would add weight and cost on ships and produce a further waste stream (usually calcium sulfate if flue gases are scrubbed by being passed through calcium hydroxide solution) which would have to be disposed of, adding yet further cost. In addition, calcium hydroxide commonly being produced by calcination of calcium carbonate releases yet more carbon dioxide into the atmosphere. While this stream is comparatively small in relation to carbon-dioxide emissions caused by combustion of fossil fuels, it needs to be taken into account as well, as part of a complete life-cycle assessment.

Localized air pollution

One source of environmental stresses on maritime vessels recently has come from states and localities, as they assess the contribution of commercial marine vessels to regional air quality problems when ships are docked at port. For instance, large marine diesel engines are believed to contribute 7 percent of mobile source nitrogen oxide emissions in Baton Rouge and New Orleans, Louisiana. Ships can also have a significant impact in areas without large commercial ports: they contribute about 37 percent of total area nitrogen oxide emissions in the Santa Barbara, California area, and that percentage is expected to increase to 61 percent by 2015. Again, there is little cruise-industry specific data on this issue. They comprise only a small fraction of the world shipping fleet, but cruise ship emissions may exert significant impacts on a local scale in specific coastal areas that are visited repeatedly. Shipboard incinerators also burn large volumes of garbage, plastics, and other waste, producing ash that must be disposed of. Incinerators may release toxic emissions as well.

In 2005, MARPOL Annex VI came into force to combat this problem. As such cruise ships now employ CCTV monitoring on the smokestacks as well as recorded measuring via opacity meter while some are also using clean burning gas turbines for electrical loads and propulsion in sensitive areas.

Greenhouse gas pollutants

Maritime transport accounts for 3.5% to 4% of all climate change emissions, primarily carbon dioxide. According to the World Bank, in 2022, the shipping industry's 3% of global greenhouse gas emissions make it "the sixth largest greenhouse gas emitter worldwide, ranking between Japan and Germany."

Although the industry was not a focus of attention of the Paris Climate Accord signed in 2016, the United Nations and the IMO have discussed CO2 emissions goals and limits. The First Intersessional Meeting of the IMO Working Group on Greenhouse Gas Emissions took place in Oslo, Norway on 23–27 June 2008. It was tasked with developing the technical basis for the reduction mechanisms that may form part of a future IMO regime to control greenhouse gas emissions from international shipping, and a draft of the actual reduction mechanisms themselves, for further consideration by the IMO's Marine Environment Protection Committee (MEPC). In 2018, the industry discussed in London placing limits to cut levels from a benchmark of 2008 carbon dioxide emissions by 50% by the year 2050. Some methods of reducing emissions of the industry include lowering speeds of shipping (which can be potentially problematic for perishable goods) as well as changes to fuel standards. In 2019, international shipping organizations, including the International Chamber of Shipping, proposed creating a $5 billion fund to support the research and technology necessary to cut GHG emissions.

Another approach to reducing the impact of greenhouse gas emissions from shipping was launched by vetting agency RightShip, which developed an online "Greenhouse Gas (GHG) Emissions Rating" as a systematic way for the industry to compare a ship's CO2 emissions with peer vessels of a similar size and type. Based on the IMO Energy Efficiency Design Index (EEDI) that applies to ships built from 2013, RightShip's GHG Rating can also be applied to vessels built prior to 2013, allowing for effective vessel comparison across the world's fleet. The GHG Rating utilises an A to G scale, where A represents the most efficient ships. It measures the theoretical amount of carbon dioxide emitted per tonne nautical mile travelled, based on the design characteristics of the ship at time of build such as cargo carrying capacity, engine power and fuel consumption. Higher rated ships can deliver significantly lower CO2 emissions across the voyage length, which means they also use less fuel and are cheaper to run.

Decarbonization of shipping 
Nuclear marine propulsion has been proposed as the only long-proven and scalable propulsion technology that produces practically zero greenhouse gas emissions. Advances in small modular reactors which aim to mass produce nuclear power plants of smaller power output (e.g. the OPEN100 project aims for a 100 Megawatt pressurized water reactor whereas currently available Generation III+ reactors like the EPR have nameplate capacities in excess of a Gigawatt, or 1600 Megawatts in the case of the EPR) and lower cost could make nuclear marine propulsion more economic. Given a current global reactor fleet of just over 400 commercial nuclear power plants, shipping represents a potentially much larger market than land based power has been to date.

Net zero fuels could be used. Green hydrogen and ammonia produced from zero-carbon electricity (solar or wind power), are "the most promising options ...  to decarbonize shipping" in 2022, according to the World Bank. Biofuels can be net-zero fuels if "the production of fuel removes a quantity of carbon dioxide from the atmosphere that is equivalent to the amount of carbon dioxide emitted during combustion." On July 21, 2022, Carnival's AIDAprima "became the first larger scale cruise ship to be bunkered with a blend of marine biofuel ... made from 100% sustainable raw materials such as waste cooking oil, and marine gas oil (MGO)." As of April 2022, "ammonia, methanol and methane are viable deep sea shipping fuels, while compressed and liquid hydrogen are not", according to a World Economic Forum article. The world's first hydrogen-powered tugboat was launched in May 2022, at the Astilleros Armon shipyard in Navia, Spain, and is scheduled to enter service in the Port of Antwerp-Bruges in December 2022. Dual fuels engines, fuel storage options, and retrofit readiness are important to ensure adaptability. Stena was the first shipowner in the world to retrofit a large vessel for methanol, converting its ro-pax Stena Germanica in 2015. Stena is partnering with methanol producer Proman and with MAN Energy Solutions to retrofit engines for dual-fuel operation on diesel and methanol.

Wind power is a traditional choice for shipping. Wallenius Marine is "developing the Oceanbird, a cargo ship powered by wind that can carry 7,000 cars."  K Line is installing Seawing wind propulsion systems on five of its bulk carriers. The kite parafoils, which fly about 300 meters above the sea level, are estimated to reduce emissions by about 20%.

Battery power is useful for short trips. Sparky, an "all-electric 70 tonne bollard pull harbor tugboat", is "the first e-tug of its type in the world." Sparky was christened in Auckland in August 2022. The world's first hybrid tugboat, the Foss tug Carolyn Dorothy, began operation in 2009 in the Port of Los Angeles and the Port of Long Beach. The tour boat Kvitbjørn, ("polar bear"), operates in Svalbard, just a few hundred miles from the North Pole, piloting a newly developed Volvo Penta hybrid-electric propulsion system. In June 2022, the Danish electric ferry Ellen made a record 90 km voyage on a single charge.

In 2021 the Center for Strategic and International Studies stated that governments and shipping industry leaders, such as Maersk, Mediterranean Shipping Company, and France’s CMA CGM "have shown interest in decarbonization projects." In 2021 the European Union (EU) signaled "strong policy support for maritime decarbonization through their ‘Fit For 55’ (FF55) proposal, a package of 14 legislative proposals." However, as of June 2022, "only 33 out of 94 (35%) of the major shipping companies have a clearly expressed target to be net zero by latest 2050 and/or have committed to IMO targets of 50% absolute reduction in 2050 compared to the 2008 level."

Groups that represent more than 90% of the global shipping industry have called for a globally applicable carbon tax on the shipping industry's emissions, in order to provide financial incentives for implementation of new technologies, and provide necessary funding for research and development.

A 2021 article states that extensive research and development is needed, as well as retrofitting and operational changes.

The rapidly changing industry response to decarbonization can be monitored in a weekly newsletter, several conferences, and a two day overview online course.

"Delay beyond 2023 would mean the future transition for international shipping is too rapid to be feasible," says Alice Larkin. "It has to be all hands on deck for international shipping now.”

Oil spills
Most commonly associated with ship pollution are oil spills. While less frequent than the pollution that occurs from daily operations, oil spills have devastating effects. While being toxic to marine life, polycyclic aromatic hydrocarbons (PAHs), the components in crude oil, are very difficult to clean up, and last for years in the sediment and marine environment. Marine species constantly exposed to PAHs can exhibit developmental problems, susceptibility to disease, and abnormal reproductive cycles. One of the more widely known spills was the Exxon Valdez incident in Alaska. The ship ran aground and dumped a massive amount of oil into the ocean in March 1989. Despite efforts of scientists, managers and volunteers, over 400,000 seabirds, about 1,000 sea otters, and immense numbers of fish were killed.

Wastewater

Blackwater is sewage, wastewater from toilets and medical facilities, which can contain harmful bacteria, pathogens, viruses, intestinal parasites, and harmful nutrients. Discharges of untreated or inadequately treated sewage can cause bacterial and viral contamination of fisheries and shellfish beds, producing risks to public health. Nutrients in sewage, such as nitrogen and phosphorus, promote excessive algal blooms, which consumes oxygen in the water and can lead to fish kills and destruction of other aquatic life.

Greywater is wastewater from the sinks, showers, galleys, laundry, and cleaning activities aboard a ship. It can contain a variety of pollutant substances, including fecal coliforms, detergents, oil and grease, metals, organic compounds, petroleum hydrocarbons, nutrients, food waste, medical and dental waste. Sampling done by EPA and the state of Alaska found that untreated greywater from cruise ships can contain pollutants at variable strengths and that it can contain levels of fecal coliform bacteria several times greater than is typically found in untreated domestic wastewater. Greywater has potential to cause adverse environmental effects because of concentrations of nutrients and other oxygen-demanding materials, in particular. Greywater is typically the largest source of liquid waste generated by cruise ships (90 to 95 percent of the total). Estimates of greywater range from 110 to 320 liters per day per person, or 330,000 to 960,000 liters per day for a 3,000-person cruise ship.

A large cruise ship (3,000 passengers and crew) generates an estimated 55,000 to 110,000 liters per day of blackwater waste.

MARPOL annex IV was brought into force September 2003 strictly limiting untreated waste discharge. Modern cruise ships are most commonly installed with a membrane bioreactor type treatment plant for all blackwater and greywater, such as G&O, Zenon or Rochem bioreactors which produce near drinkable quality effluent to be re-used in the machinery spaces as technical water.

Solid waste
Solid waste generated on a ship includes glass, paper, cardboard, aluminium and steel cans, and plastics. It can be either non-hazardous or hazardous in nature. Solid waste that enters the ocean may become marine debris, and can then pose a threat to marine organisms, humans, coastal communities, and industries that utilize marine waters. Cruise ships typically manage solid waste by a combination of source reduction, waste minimization, and recycling. However, as much as 75 percent of solid waste is incinerated on board, and the ash typically is discharged at sea, although some is landed ashore for disposal or recycling. Marine mammals, fish, sea turtles, and birds can be injured or killed from entanglement with plastics and other solid waste that may be released or disposed off of cruise ships. On average, each cruise ship passenger generates at least two pounds of non-hazardous solid waste per day. With large cruise ships carrying several thousand passengers, the amount of waste generated in a day can be massive. For a large cruise ship, about 8 tons of solid waste are generated during a one-week cruise. It has been estimated that 24% of the solid waste generated by vessels worldwide (by weight) comes from cruise ships. Most cruise ship garbage is treated on board (incinerated, pulped, or ground up) for discharge overboard. When garbage must be off-loaded (for example, because glass and aluminium cannot be incinerated), cruise ships can put a strain on port reception facilities, which are rarely adequate to the task of serving a large passenger vessel.

Bilge water
On a ship, oil often leaks from engine and machinery spaces or from engine maintenance activities and mixes with water in the bilge, the lowest part of the hull of the ship. Though bilge water is filtered and cleaned before being discharged, oil in even minute concentrations can kill fish or have various sub-lethal chronic effects. Bilge water also may contain solid wastes and pollutants containing high levels of oxygen-demanding material, oil and other chemicals. A typically large cruise ship will generate an average of 8 tonnes of oily bilge water for each 24 hours of operation. To maintain ship stability and eliminate potentially hazardous conditions from oil vapors in these areas, the bilge spaces need to be flushed and periodically pumped dry. However, before a bilge can be cleared out and the water discharged, the oil that has been accumulated needs to be extracted from the bilge water, after which the extracted oil can be reused, incinerated, and/or offloaded in port. If a separator, which is normally used to extract the oil, is faulty or is deliberately bypassed, untreated oily bilge water could be discharged directly into the ocean, where it can damage marine life.

Some shipping companies, including large cruise shipping lines, have sometimes violated regulations by illegally bypassing the onboard oily water separator and discharging untreated oily wastewater. In the US these violations by means of a so-called "magic pipe" have been prosecuted and resulted in large fines, but in other countries enforcement has been mixed.

International regulation

Some of the major international efforts in the form of treaties are the Marine Pollution Treaty, Honolulu, which deals with regulating marine pollution from ships, and the UN Convention on Law of the Sea, which deals with marine species and pollution. While plenty of local and international regulations have been introduced throughout maritime history, much of the current regulations are considered inadequate. "In general, the treaties tend to emphasize the technical features of safety and pollution control measures without going to the root causes of sub-standard shipping, the absence of incentives for compliance and the lack of enforceability of measures."

The most common problems encountered with international shipping arise from paperwork errors and customs brokers not having the proper information about the items. Cruise ships, for example, are exempt from regulation under the US discharge permit system (NPDES, under the Clean Water Act) that requires compliance with technology-based standards. In the Caribbean, many ports lack proper waste disposal facilities, and many ships dump their waste at sea.

Moreover, due to the complexities of shipping trade and the difficulties involved in regulating this business, a comprehensive and generally acceptable regulatory framework on corporate responsibility for reducing GHG emissions is unlikely to be achieved soon. In fact, emissions are continuing to increase. A 2016 journal article recommends that under such circumstances, it is necessary for the states, the shipping industry and global organizations to explore and discuss market based mechanisms for vessel-sourced GHG emissions reduction.

Issues by region

Asia

European Union
 Cruise ship pollution in Europe
 EU Reducing Greenhouse Gas emissions from the shipping sector
 EU Sustainable Shipping Forum (ESSF)
 EC-IMO Energy Efficiency Project.  The 4-year project aims to establish Maritime Technology Cooperation Centres in 5 regions: Africa, Asia, the Caribbean, Latin America and the Pacific.  Through technical assistance and capacity-building, the centres will promote the uptake of low carbon technologies and operations in maritime transport in the less developed countries in the respective region.  This will also support the implementation of the internationally agreed energy efficiency rules and standards (EEDI and SEEMP).
 MRV Monitoring, reporting and verification of CO2 emissions from large ships using EU ports

United Kingdom
 Merchant Shipping Act 1995
 Merchant Shipping (Pollution) Act 2006

United States
It is expected that, (from 2004) "...shipping traffic to and from the United States is projected to double by 2020." However, many shipping companies and port operators in North America (Canada and the United States) have adopted the Green Marine Environmental Program to limit operational impacts on the environment.

 Act to Prevent Pollution from Ships
 American Bureau of Shipping
 Cruise ship pollution in the United States
 National Oil and Hazardous Substances Contingency Plan
 Oil Pollution Act of 1990
 Regulation of ship pollution in the United States

See also 

 Bottom paint
 Classification society (technical standards NGO)
 Convention on the Prevention of Marine Pollution by Dumping of Wastes and Other Matter
 Environmental impact of transport
 Environmental threats to the Great Barrier Reef
 International Association of Classification Societies
 List of environmental issues
 Marine debris
 Marine fuel management
 Mobility transition
 North Pacific Gyre
 Oil spill
 Particle (ecology)
 Shipping route
 Tributyltin
 Zero emission vehicle

References

Further reading

External links 
Maritime International Secretariat Services - Shipping Industry Guidance on Environmental Compliance
GloBallast partnership (IMO)
International Convention for the Control and Management of Ships' Ballast Water and Sediments, 2004 - IMO
Cruise Ship Pollution Overview - Oceana
Ecological facts on ballast water
CO2 emissions calculator for transporting cargo by sea
The Global MTCC Network

 
Ocean pollution

de:Umweltschutz in der Seeschifffahrt